Lefèvre is a common family name derived from the original northern French surname Lefebvre. Common variations include Lefevre, LeFevre, Le Fevre, le Fevre, Le Fèvre, le Fèvre, LeFever, Lefevere, Le Fêvre and le Fêvre.

Surnames

Lefèvre
 Lefèvre family, French tapestry weavers, or one of its members; Lancelot, Pierre, Philip or Jean
 Jacques Lefèvre d'Étaples (c. 1455 – c. 1536), French theologian and a leading figure in French humanism
 Jacob Faber, 16th-century block-cutter, engraver, designer of decorative prints and publisher, in Switzerland and France
 Alain Lefèvre (1962–), French Canadian pianist and composer
 André Lefevere, Belgian-American translation theorist
 André Lefèvre (Scouting) (1887–1946), French Scouting notable
 André Joseph Lefèvre (1869–1929), French Minister of Defence
 Édouard Lefèvre (1839–1894), French entomologist
 Edwin Lefèvre (1871–1943), American journalist
 Géo Lefèvre (1877–1961), French journalist creator of the Tour de France
 Françoise Lefèvre (born 1942), French writer
 Gustave Lefèvre (1831–1910), French Romantic composer
 Guy Lefèvre de la Boderie (1541–1598), French orientalist, Bible scholar and poet
 Jacques Lefèvre d'Étaples (also called Jacob Faber Stapulensis; c. 1455–1536), French theologian and humanist
 Jacques Lefèvre (fencer) (born 1928), French Olympic fencer
 Jean-Xavier Lefèvre (1763–1829), Swiss clarinetist and composer
 Laurent Lefèvre (born 1976), French cyclist
 Pascal Lefèvre (born 1965), French javelin thrower
 Raymond Lefèvre (1929–2008), French conductor of light music
 Robert Lefèvre (1755–1830), French painter
 Sophie Lefèvre (born 1981), French tennis player
 Théo Lefèvre (1914–1973), 39th Prime Minister of Belgium

Lefevre
 Albert Lefevre (1873–1928), American psychologist
 Charles Lefevre (1893–1948), French flying ace
 Ernesto Tisdel Lefevre (1876–1922), Panamanian politician
 Rachelle Lefevre (born 1979), Canadian actress

LeFevre
 Adam LeFevre (born 1950), American character actor
 Carlene LeFevre, American competitive eater
 Eva LeFevre (1851–1948), American attorney
 Frank J. LeFevre (1874–1941), United States Representative from New York, son of Jacob Le Fever
 Mylon LeFevre (born 1944), American Christian music singer
 Rich LeFevre, American competitive eater
 Robert LeFevre (1911–1986), American businessman
 Ted LeFevre (born 1964), American theatrical set designer

Le Fevre, le Fevre, Le Fêvre, le Fêvre 
 Arthur Le Fevre (1887–1957), Australian golfer
 Benjamin Le Fevre (1838–1922), 19th century politician from Ohio
 George Le Fevre (1848–1891), surgeon and politician in colonial Australia
 Jay Le Fevre (1893–1970), United States Representative from New York
 Jean Le Fevre de Saint-Remy (sometimes Fèvre, c. 1395–1468), Burgundian chronicler and seigneur of Saint Remy 1420–1435
 Ulrik le Fevre (born 1946), Danish soccer player and manager

Le Fèvre, le Fèvre
 André le Fèvre, Dutch footballer at the 1924 Summer Olympics
 Anne Dacier (née Le Fèvre; 1654–1720), French scholar and translator of the classics
 Jacques Le Fèvre (mid c. 17th–1716), French Roman Catholic theologian and controversialist
 Jean Le Fèvre (astronomer) (1652–1706), French astronomer and physicist
 Nicaise le Fèvre (also known as Nicasius le Febure; 1615–1669), French chemist and alchemist 
 Tanneguy Le Fèvre (also known as Tanaquillus Faber; 1615–1672), French classical scholar

LeFever
 Jacob LeFever (1830–1905), American politician

Lefevere
 André Lefevere (1945–1996), Belgian-American translation theorist
 Patrick Lefevere (born 1955), Belgian cycling manager
 Peter Paul Lefevere (1804–1869), Belgian-American Catholic bishop

Combinations with other surnames
 Charles Shaw-Lefevre (politician) (1759–1823), born Charles Shaw, British Whig politician
 Charles Shaw-Lefevre, 1st Viscount Eversley (1794–1888), his son, Speaker of the House of Commons
 George Shaw-Lefevre, 1st Baron Eversley (1831–1928), British Liberal Party politician
 Jacques Guarrigue-Lefèvre (born 1961), founder, owner and current president of Paris Élysée private club
 John Shaw-Lefevre (1797–1879), British barrister, Whig politician and civil servant
 Julia Marton-Lefèvre (born 1946), French conservationist

As a given name
 Lefevre James Cranstone (1822–1893), English artist

Related surnames
 Lefebvre
 Lefebre
 Lefébure

Other uses
 The LeFevres (also called The Singing LeFevres), American Southern gospel singing group
 Lefevre Peninsula
 Papillon-Lefèvre disease
 Lefèvre-Utile, French biscuit manufacturer
 Winnebago War (also called Le Fèvre Indian War)

See also
 Fevre Dream, a 1982 vampire novel by George R. R. Martin
 Febvre (disambiguation)

French-language surnames
Occupational surnames
Lists of people by surname